Freienbach is a municipality in Höfe District in the canton of Schwyz in Switzerland.

History
Freienbach is first mentioned in 972 as Friginbach.

Geography

Of this area, 40.7% is used for agricultural purposes, while 23.8% is forested. Of the rest of the land, 31% is settled (buildings or roads) and the remainder (4.5%) is non-productive (rivers, glaciers or mountains).

The municipality is located on Lake Zurich and stretches from the lake (elevation ) to the Etzel mountain (elevation ). It consists of the villages of Freienbach, Pfäffikon (not to be confused with Pfäffikon in the canton of Zurich), Wilen, Bäch, Hurden (located on the Seedamm) and the two islands of  Lützelau and Ufenau (Ufnau).

Demographics
, 23.2% of the population was made up of foreign nationals. Over the last 10 years the population has grown at a rate of 23.8%. Most of the population speaks German (87.9%), with Italian being second most common (2.3%) and Serbo-Croatian being third (2.0%).

 the gender distribution of the population was 50.6% male and 49.4% female.  The age distribution, in Freienbach is; 2,963 people or 22.7% of the population is between 0 and 19.  4,174 people or 32.0% are 20 to 39, and 4,432 people or 33.9% are 40 to 64.  The senior population distribution is 977 people or 7.5% are 65 to 74.  There are 407 people or 3.1% who are 70 to 79 and 102 people or 0.78% of the population who are over 80.

 there are 5,558 households, of which 1,653 households (or about 29.7%) contain only a single individual.  274 or about 4.9% are large households, with at least five members.

In the 2007 election the most popular party was the SVP which received 44.1% of the vote.  The next three most popular parties were the FDP (19%), the SPS (16.3%) and the CVP (15%).

In Freienbach about 74.7% of the population (between age 25-64) have completed either non-mandatory upper secondary education or additional higher education (either university or a Fachhochschule).

Freienbach has an unemployment rate of 1.7%.  , there were 184 people employed in the primary economic sector and about 53 businesses involved in this sector.  2,718 people are employed in the secondary sector and there are 216 businesses in this sector.  7,174 people are employed in the tertiary sector, with 1,029 businesses in this sector.

Of the rest of the population,  there are 6 individuals (or about 0.05% of the population) who belong to the Christian Catholic faith, there are 202 individuals (or about 1.55% of the population) who belong to the Orthodox Church, and there are 18 individuals (or about 0.14% of the population) who belong to another Christian church. There are 12 individuals (or about 0.09% of the population) who are Jewish, and 633 (or about 4.85% of the population) who are Islamic. There are 92 individuals (or about 0.70% of the population) who belong to another church (not listed on the census), 1,151 (or about 8.82% of the population) belong to no church, are agnostic or atheist, and 385 individuals (or about 2.95% of the population) did not answer the question.

The historical population is given in the following table:

Transport 
The municipality of Freienbach is served by six railway stations. Of these,  is the most important, being served by both long distance and Zurich S-Bahn trains. The remaining stations each serve a subset of the S-Bahn trains:

  is served by S8
  is served by S8
  is served by S40
  is served by S5 and S40
  is served by S2, S5, S8 and S40
  is served by S40

Sport
FC Freienbach is the municipality's football club.

Heritage sites of national significance
The prehistoric lakeside settlement at Hurden/Seedamm and Ufnau, the parish church of St. Peter and Paul with Martin's Chapel, the Seedamm Cultural Center of Pfäffikon and Pfäffikon Castle are listed as Swiss heritage site of national significance.  The prehistoric settlements at Hurden Rosshorn and Hurden Seefeld are part of the Prehistoric Pile dwellings around the Alps a UNESCO World Heritage Site.

References

External links
 

 
Municipalities of the canton of Schwyz
Cities in Switzerland
Populated places on Lake Zurich